Don Granato (born August 11, 1967) is an American professional ice hockey coach and former player. He is the head coach of the Buffalo Sabres of the National Hockey League (NHL).

Playing career
After two years playing with the then named Madison Capitals of the United States Hockey League (USHL), Granato was recruited to play for the University of Wisconsin and played there for four years, winning a national title in the 1989–90 season. During his last year with the team in 1990–91, he served as team's captain. After college he played for two years with the Columbus Chill of the ECHL before retiring as player in order to move into coaching.

Coaching career
Granato served as head coach of the Green Bay Gamblers and Wisconsin Capitols of the United States Hockey League (USHL) from 1993 to 1997, where he led the Gamblers to the league finals. He was then hired by the Columbus Chill of the East Coast Hockey League (ECHL) in 1997 and then Peoria Rivermen in 1999. He won the Kelly Cup as a coach in 2000 with the Peoria Rivermen and was then promoted to head coach of the Worcester IceCats of the American Hockey League (AHL). During the 2000–01 AHL season, Granato won the Louis A. R. Pieri Memorial Award as the most outstanding coach of the AHL. After five seasons with the IceCats, he was promoted to an assistant coach with their National Hockey League (NHL) affiliate, the St. Louis Blues. In 2008, he became head coach of the Chicago Wolves of the AHL but was released in 2009 after seven games.

From 2013 to 2016, he was head coach of the USA Hockey National Team Development Program. In March 2016, Granato assumed an assistant coaching position under his brother, Tony, with the Wisconsin Badgers men's ice hockey team. On June 15, 2017, he became an assistant coach, along with Ulf Samuelsson, under Joel Quenneville of the NHL's Chicago Blackhawks.

In 2019, he was hired as an assistant coach of the Buffalo Sabres. On March 17, 2021, Granato became the interim head coach of the Buffalo Sabres, replacing the fired Ralph Krueger. Granato posted a 9–16–3 record in 28 games with the Sabres to finish off the 2020–21 season head coach. The interim tag was removed on 2021 June 29 for the 2021–22 season Sabres head coach.

Head coaching record

NHL

Personal life
Granato is the brother of Cammi and Tony, and the brother-in-law of Ray Ferraro.

References

External links
 
 Coaching profile at Eliteprospects.com
 Don Granato new head coach for Wolves

1967 births
Living people
American men's ice hockey centers
American ice hockey coaches
American people of Italian descent
Buffalo Sabres coaches
Chicago Wolves coaches
Chicago Blackhawks coaches
Columbus Chill players
Ice hockey coaches from Illinois
Ice hockey players from Illinois
Madison Capitols players
NCAA men's ice hockey national champions
People from Downers Grove, Illinois
St. Louis Blues coaches
Vancouver Canucks scouts
Wisconsin Badgers men's ice hockey players